San Martino is a frazione of the comune of Taurianova of about 2,000 inhabitants situated in the Province of Reggio Calabria.

History
The origins of San Martino dates back to the mid of 10th century, by refugees of ancient Tauriana, destroyed by the Saracen.

During the Normans domination San Martino became the seat of one of the most important castles of the kingdom.

The city was completely destroyed during the 1783 Calabrian earthquakes.

Famous people
Domenico Caruso (March 25, 1933) Noted scholar of the Calabrian dialects.
Giulio Nasso  (November 28, 1906 – October 23, 1999) Emigrated to New York at age 18 has become a famous American builder.

External links
Storia e Folklore Calabrese di Domenico Caruso

Frazioni of the Province of Reggio Calabria